Seekonk may refer to:

 Seekonk, Massachusetts, a town in the United States
Seekonk High School
 Seekonk River, a body of water in Rhode Island, United States
 Seekonk (band), a rock band